Ralph John Lundeen (May 3, 1917 – March 30, 2004) was an American football and basketball coach. He served as the head football coach at Huron College—later known as Huron University—in Huron, South Dakota from 1950 to 1953, and Macalester College in St. Paul, Minnesota from 1957 to 1958. Lundeen played college football at the University of Minnesota during the early 1940s.

Head coaching record

Football

References

1917 births
2004 deaths
American football ends
Basketball coaches from Minnesota
Huron Screaming Eagles athletic directors
Huron Screaming Eagles football coaches
Huron Screaming Eagles men's basketball coaches
Macalester Scots athletic directors
Macalester Scots football coaches
Macalester Scots men's basketball coaches
Minnesota Golden Gophers football players
Sports coaches from Minneapolis
Players of American football from Minneapolis
Sportspeople from Minneapolis